Carilda Oliver Labra  (6 July 1922 – 29 August 2018) was a Cuban poet.  She was born in Matanzas and died there as well.

Oliver Labra studied law at the University of Havana. She was also known to excel at drawing, painting and sculpting.

Known as one of the most influential Cuban poets, her work is focused upon love, the role of women in society, and herself. Oliver Labra received numerous national and international prizes including the National Poetry Prize (1950), National Literature Award (1997) and the José de Vasconcelos International Prize (2002). Me desordeno, amor, me desordeno might be her most famous poem. Other works such as Discurso de Eva ("Eve's Discourse") also show a profound literary technique.

Her debut collection in 1943, Lyric Prelude (Preludio lirico) immediately established her as an important poetic voice. At the South of My Throat made her famous: the coveted National Prize for poetry came to her in 1950 as a result of the popular and notorious book, At the South of My Throat (Al sur de mi garganta) 1949. In honor of the tri-centennial of Sor Juana Inés de la Cruz in a contest sponsored by The Latin American Society in Washington D.C., in 1950, she had also received the national Cuban First Prize for her poems. Her work was highly praised by Gabriela Mistral, the Chilean poet and first Latin American woman to win the Nobel Prize for Literature in 1945. In 1958, Oliver Labra published Feverish memory (Memoria de la fiebre) which added to her notoriety as a blatantly erotic woman. The book concerned a theme which has dominated her poetry—lost love, as it was written after the untimely death of her second husband.

References

1922 births
2018 deaths
Cuban poets
Cuban women poets
20th-century Cuban poets
20th-century Cuban women writers
21st-century Cuban poets
21st-century Cuban women writers
People from Matanzas
University of Havana alumni